William Addis (1734–1808) was an English entrepreneur believed to have produced the first mass-produced toothbrush in 1780.

Addis was born in 1734 in England, probably in Clerkenwell, London.

In 1770, Addis had been gaoled for causing a riot in Spitalfields. While in prison, and observing the use of a broom to sweep the floor, he decided that the prevalent method used to clean teeth at the timecrushed shell or soot with a cloth was ineffective and could be improved. To that end, he saved a small animal bone left over from the meal he had eaten the previous night, into which he drilled small holes. He then obtained some bristles from one of his guards, which he tied in tufts that he then passed through the holes in the bone, and which he finally sealed with glue.

After his release, he started a business to manufacture the toothbrushes he had built, and he soon became very rich. He died in 1808, and left the business to his eldest son, also called William, and it stayed in family ownership until 1996. Under the name Wisdom Toothbrushes, the company now manufactures 70 million toothbrushes per year in the UK.

By 1840 toothbrushes were being mass-produced in England, France, Germany, and Japan.

Hertford Museum holds approximately 5000 toothbrushes that make up part of the Addis Collection. The Addis factory on Ware Road was a major employer in the town until 1996. Since the closure of the factory, Hertford Museum has received photographs and documents relating to the archive, and collected oral histories from former employees.

Notes

References

External links 
 Wisdom Toothbrushes Home Page

1734 births
1808 deaths
18th-century English businesspeople
English inventors